Charles Town Cave  —  also formerly known as Crystal Lake Cave and Lakeland Cave  —  is located in the center of Charles Town, West Virginia, United States. One entrance was in the cellar of a bakery (since demolished) and led down to a passage about 175 feet long to a large pool of clear water about 25 feet in diameter. Much of the cave is under the current Old Opera House building.

The cave was discovered accidentally in 1906 and was for a time developed as a commercial show cave in the late 1920s and early 1930s. Water sampling in 1997 showed the presence of petroleum contamination in the water.

The cave is closed to the public. Rumors persist about other entrances to the cave in various Charles Town and Ranson buildings.

References

Citations

External links
History of the Cave in Charles Town on YouTube

Caves of West Virginia
Limestone caves
Landforms of Jefferson County, West Virginia
Charles Town, West Virginia